Rusk County Airport  is a county-owned, public-use airport in Rusk County, Texas, United States. It is located three nautical miles (6 km) west of the central business district of Henderson, Texas.  The current airport manager is Ron Franks, since 2013.

Although many U.S. airports use the same three-letter location identifier for the FAA and IATA, this facility is assigned RFI by the FAA but has no designation from the IATA.

Facilities and aircraft 
It has two asphalt paved runways: 17/35 is 4,004 by 75 feet (1,220 x 23 m) and 12/30 is 3,002 by 75 feet (915 x 23 m).

For the 12-month period ending September 16, 2008, the airport had 10,000 aircraft operations, an average of 27 per day: 96% general aviation and 4% military. At that time there were 20 aircraft based at this airport: 85% single-engine, 5% glider and 10% ultralight.

References

External links 
 Rusk County Airport, official site
  at Texas DOT
 Aerial image as of January 1996 from USGS The National Map
 

Airports in Texas
Buildings and structures in Rusk County, Texas
Transportation in Rusk County, Texas